Alessio Musti (born 12 May 1974), is an Italian retired futsal player and coach of the Italian national futsal team.

Honours

Player

Club
Torrino
 Serie A: 1992–93, 1993–94.
 Coppa Italia: 1992–93, 1993–94, 1994–95.
Lazio
 Serie A: 1997–98.
 Coppa Italia: 1997–98, 1998–99, 2002–03.

Manager

Club
Cogianco
Serie A2: 2011-12
Coppa Italia Serie A2: 2011-12

References

1974 births
Living people
Futsal coaches